Sherwood Rise is a residential area in the north of the city of Nottingham in the United Kingdom. It is bordered by Carrington, Basford, Forest Fields and Sherwood.

Politics
Sherwood Rise is part of the Berridge ward and the Nottingham East parliamentary constituency. The current MP is Chris Leslie, who was elected in 2010, and most recently 2017, with a majority of over 19,500 votes. Berridge has three Labour Party councillors—Carole Jones, Toby Neal and Mohammed Ibrahim.

Amenities
Sherwood Rise has a post office on Beech Avenue as well as several shops and cafés located across a number of streets.

The area is served by the Yellow Line Nottingham City Transport bus routes (69–71). These all begin in the city centre.

References

External links
City Council
Areas of Nottingham